Mircea Roman (born June 24, 1958) is a Romanian sculptor.

Roman was born in Băiuț, Maramureș County in Romania.

Prizes and titles
2017 Award of the Fine Artists Union of Romania for Sculpture 
2008 Golden Medal of the Union of Fine Artists Union of the Republic of Moldova
2000 Order of the Faithful Service in the Degree of Officer
1993/1994 Delphine Studio London
1992 Grand Prize of Osaka Triennial
1988 Atelier 35 Bucharest Prize

Works in public collections
Roman's work is represented in numerous museum and public collections including the Osaka Contemporary Art and Culture Center, National Museum of Contemporary Art Bucharest, National Museum of Art in Bucharest, Museum of Visual Arts Galați, The Museum of Recent Art, Bucharest, Craiova Art Museum.

References

Further reading
Davidian, Alexandru. Mircea Roman „din fragmente”, Editura Vellant, București/ Mircea Roman "Fragments", Vellant Publishing House, Bucharest, 2018 
Cârneci, Magda. Art et pouvoir in Roumanie1945-1989. L'Harmattan, Paris, 2007. 
Titu, Alexandra. Experimentul în arta românească după 1960. Meridiane, București, 2003. 
Guță, Adrian. Generația '80 în artele vizuale, Editura Paralela 45, 2009
Prut, Constantin, Dicționar de artă modernă și contemporană, (ediție imbunătățită) Ed. Univers Enciclopedic 2002
Aoky, Auka. Mircea Roman, Londonzok, mai/iunie 2002
Nicodim, Ion; Balaci Ruxandra (organizatori ai expoziției) – „Artiști pentru România/ Des Artistes Pour la Roumanie”, Muzeul Național de Artă al României, București, 1992,
Kimura, Shigenobu; Kind, Phillip; Kyung-Sung; Nakahara, Yusuke; Takahashi, Toru; Yasuda, Atsuo – Comment – Osaka Trienalle ’92, Catalogul *Trienalei Internaționale de sculptură, Osaka, 1992, Osaka Foundation of Culture, Nissha Printing Co., 1992, p. 13; 
La Biennnale Di Venezia: 46. Esposizione Internazionale d’Arte, English Edition Coll Cataloghi Marsilio Editori, 1995, p. 183

External links
 Mircea Roman - "Eu le-am făcut sculpturilor mele suflete” - Galeria celebritatilor, Valentin Iacob, Formula AS, 2012, nr. 1025

1958 births
Living people
Romanian sculptors
People from Maramureș County